George Waring (20 February 1925 – 15 February 2010) was a British television actor from 1962 to 2000. He also had occasional feature film credits. He was best known for appearing on Coronation Street as Arnold Swain, the bigamist husband of Emily Bishop in 1980. Earlier in the 1970s he appeared in Crown Court, the long running ITV courtroom drama series. He also appeared in episodes of Doctor Who in 1967.

He attended Ducie High School, Manchester and joined the Royal Air Force at the age of 18. After acting with a service repertory company in Europe he had various jobs, worked in repertory theatres in England and appeared in West End plays including Alfie in 1963.

Filmography

References

External links

1925 births
2010 deaths
English male soap opera actors
People from Eccles, Greater Manchester
Deaths from cancer in England
Royal Air Force personnel of World War II
People educated at Ducie Technical High School for Boys
20th-century English male actors
Male actors from Salford